Bambusa bicicatricata is a species of Bambusa bamboo.

Synonyms 
Bambusa bicicatricata has 3 synonyms.

Distribution 
Bambusa bicicatricata is endemic to the temperate regions of Hainan province of China.

Description 
Bambusa bicicatricata can grow up to a height of 1,000 cm. It has a 55–75 mm diameter woody stem. There are 6 anthers, each 3.5 mm long.

References 

bicicatricata
Flora of Hainan
Plants described in 1978